Hur (also Romanized as Ḩūr) is a village in Vilkij-e Jonubi Rural District of Vilkij District, Namin County, Ardabil province, Iran. At the 2006 census, its population was 3,141 in 644 households. The following census in 2011 counted 3,415 people in 937 households. The latest census in 2016 showed a population of 3,248 people in 955 households; it was the largest village in its rural district.

References 

Namin County

Towns and villages in Namin County

Populated places in Ardabil Province

Populated places in Namin County